The Dasharath Stadium Disaster occurred on 12 March 1988 at the Dasharath Stadium in Kathmandu, Nepal during a football match between the Janakpur Cigarette Factory and Bangladeshi side Muktijoddha Sangsad KC for the 1988 Tribhuvan Challenge Shield. 93 people were killed and 100 more were injured when attempting to flee from a hailstorm inside the hypethral national Dasarath Rangasala Stadium. The Dasharath Stadium disaster is the 9th biggest stadium disaster until 2006 (in terms of human loss, 93 spectators died) and the worst stadium disaster in Nepal.

Build up
The Dasarath Rangasala Stadium is open terrace on three sides with the west side having the only grandstand. It hosts most of Nepal's domestic and international games and the final of the Tribhuvan Challenge Shield 1988 made no exception. 30,000 spectators were present. News reports that the weather on the day was not bad with sunshine throughout the day. Mahesh Bista, the-then executive committee member of the All Nepal Football Association, said they were initially looking forward to postpone the match but, "we decided to hold it as the rainy morning had changed into a sunny afternoon".

Disaster
There are often significant hailstorms in Nepal at this time of year and on this occasion large hail began to lash the crowd causing some panic. The crowd surged towards the only cover (the west stand) but were beaten back by the police. They then returned to the south terrace where a crush developed in a tunnel exit through the terrace. The crowd could not escape because the stadium doors were locked, causing a fatal crush at the front.

Aftermath
Despite the huge loss of life and hundreds of fans being injured, the autocratic government of Nepal at that time decided not to compensate the victims. The reason they gave was that the fans were at the stadium by their own choice and the government played no part in causing the catastrophe.

After the disaster, the Minister for Education and Culture, Keshar Bahadur Bista and president of the All Nepal Football Association, Kamal Thapa resigned.

The stadium was later renovated for the 1999 South Asian Games with the help of the Chinese government.

References

External links 
 BBC News Report
 Accidents Planet Report
 www.contrast.org – Hillsborough

1988 disasters in Nepal
1988 in Nepal
Man-made disasters in Nepal
Human stampedes in 1988
Stadium disaster
Stadium disasters
1988 in Asian football
Football in Nepal
Stadium disaster
Stadium disaster
History of Nepal (1951–2008)
March 1988 sports events in Asia